The Israeli film industry produced over forty feature films in 2014. This article fully lists all non-pornographic films, including short films, that had a release date in that year and which were at least partly made by Israel. It does not include films first released in previous years that had release dates in 2014.  Also included is an overview of the major events in Israeli film, including film festivals and awards ceremonies, as well as lists of those films that have been particularly well received, both critically and financially.

Major releases

Notable Deaths

See also 

 2014 in film
 2014 in Israel
 Cinema of Israel
 List of Israeli submissions for the Academy Award for Best Foreign Language Film

References

External links 

Israeli
2014
Films
2014